The Kaipātiki Local Board is one of the 21 local boards of Auckland Council, and is one of the two boards overseen by the council's North Shore Ward councillors. It covers Glenfield south to Northcote Point. Its eastern border is the Northern Motorway and its western border is the Waitematā Harbour. The board sits at the Citizen's Advice Bureau in Bentley Ave, Glenfield. AUT's Akoranga Campus is the only tertiary institution in the North Shore ward, and it is in the Kaipātiki board area.

Demographics

Kaipātiki Local Board Area had a population of 88,269 at the 2018 New Zealand census, an increase of 5,775 people (7.0%) since the 2013 census, and an increase of 9,141 people (11.6%) since the 2006 census. There were 28,911 households, comprising 43,365 males and 44,907 females, giving a sex ratio of 0.97 males per female. The median age was 34.8 years (compared with 37.4 years nationally), with 16,449 people (18.6%) aged under 15 years, 20,094 (22.8%) aged 15 to 29, 41,472 (47.0%) aged 30 to 64, and 10,251 (11.6%) aged 65 or older.

Ethnicities were 58.5% European/Pākehā, 8.7% Māori, 6.1% Pacific peoples, 32.9% Asian, and 4.4% other ethnicities. People may identify with more than one ethnicity.

The percentage of people born overseas was 45.3, compared with 27.1% nationally.

Although some people chose not to answer the census's question about religious affiliation, 48.6% had no religion, 36.5% were Christian, 0.4% had Māori religious beliefs, 3.1% were Hindu, 1.7% were Muslim, 2.1% were Buddhist and 2.3% had other religions.

Of those at least 15 years old, 24,426 (34.0%) people had a bachelor's or higher degree, and 7,437 (10.4%) people had no formal qualifications. The median income was $37,000, compared with $31,800 nationally. 14,865 people (20.7%) earned over $70,000 compared to 17.2% nationally. The employment status of those at least 15 was that 39,075 (54.4%) people were employed full-time, 10,203 (14.2%) were part-time, and 2,508 (3.5%) were unemployed.

Board members
The Board has eight members. Currently they are as follows.

Election results

2016 results 

Richard Hills became ineligible to be elected to the local board, despite being the highest polling candidate, as he was elected North Shore Ward Councillor.

2019 Election results 
The following table is the results from the election. Those in bold won seats.

References

External links
 Kaipātiki Local Board, Auckland Council

Kaipātiki
Local boards of the Auckland Region